Makarov/Makarova (masculine/feminine) is a Russian surname that is derived from the male given name Makar (in turn derived from the Greek name Macarius) and literally means Makar's. It is the 29th most common Russian surname.

The Coat of arms of Makarov was approved on the 25th of January 1801 by Empress Catherine II and Emperor Paul I.

Notable Makarovs

Alexander Alexeyevich Makarov, Russian inventor in the field of mass spectrometry
Alexander Alexandrovich Makarov, Imperial Russian politician
Alexander Sergeyevich Makarov, Russian politician, mayor of the city of Tomsk, Russia
Aleksandr Viktorovich Makarov, Russian soccer goalkeeper
Aleksandr Vladimirovich Makarov, Russian soccer midfielder
Aleksandr Makarov (athlete), Soviet Russian javelin thrower
Alexei Makarov, Russian statesman
Andrei Makarov (disambiguation), multiple people
Andrei Makarov (ice hockey, born 1964), Russian ice hockey forward who played with  Ak Bars Kazan
Andrei Makarov (ice hockey, born 1966), Russian ice hockey forward who played with Metallurg Novokuznetsk
Andrey Makarov (ice hockey) (born 1993), Russian ice hockey goaltender
Andrey Makarov (racewalker) (born 1971), Belarusian race walker
Anna Makarova, Ukrainian and Russian volleyball player
Antonina Makarova, Soviet executioner and Nazi collaborator
Ekaterina Makarova, Russian tennis player
Elena Makarova, Russian tennis player
Igor Makarov (footballer, born 1961), Russian footballer with FC Lokomotiv Moscow, FC Shinnik Yaroslavl, FC Asmaral Moscow and FC Zhemchuzhina Sochi
Igor Makarov (businessman) (born 1962), Russian businessman
Igor Makarov (footballer, born 1970), Russian footballer with PFC CSKA Moscow, FC Fakel Voronezh, FC Baltika Kaliningrad and FC Uralmash Yekaterinburg
Igor Makarov (ice hockey) (born 1987), Russian ice hockey player who was drafted by the Chicago Blackhawks
Ihar Makarau, Belarusian judoka
Ivan Makarov, Russian painter
Kira Makarova, Estonian-American biologist
Konstantin Makarov, Soviet Navy admiral
Konstantin Makarov (ice hockey)
Ksenia Makarova, Russian-American figure skater
Natalia Makarova, Russian-American ballerina
Nikolai Georgievich Makarov (born 1955), Russian mathematician
Nikolay Makarov (disambiguation)
Nikolay Fyodorovich Makarov (1914–1988), Soviet firearms designer
Nikolay Makarov, Russian general, Chief of the General Staff of the Armed Forces of the Russian Federation
Oleg Aleksandrovich Makarov, Soviet international footballer
Oleg Grigoryevich Makarov, Russian cosmonaut
Oleg Vitalyevich Makarov, Soviet figure skater
Sergei Mikhaylovich Makarov, Soviet, NHL, and Olympic ice hockey forward
Sergei Makarov (ice hockey, born 1964), Soviet ice hockey defenceman
Sergey Makarov, Russian javelin thrower
Stepan Makarov, Russian admiral
Tamara Makarova, Soviet actress
Tatyana Makarova, Soviet World War II pilot and Hero of the Soviet Union
Vladimir Makarov (1947–1979) a Soviet footballer.
Major General Vladimir Makarov, former Russian police general found dead in an apparent suicide in 2023 
Vladimir Makarov, the primary antagonist in the video game Call of Duty: Modern Warfare 3
 Vyacheslav Makarov, Russian politician
Michail Makarow, German bobsledder

References

Russian-language surnames